Jagannath temple is one of the ancient temples in Mohanpur in the Midnapore district of West Bengal, India. It is situated about 20 km from Jaleswar, 16 km from Egra and 201 km from Kolkata. Idols of Jagannath, Balaram and Subhadra are present in the temple. This temple was constructed around 1611 by Parashuram Koudi of Karmahapatra family and has been renovated by the Jagannath haat unnayan committee and given a new look in 2016–17.

Every year during the punyatithi of rathayatra, thousands of devotees gather to ask for blessings from the divine Jagannath dev, balaram and Subhadra.
Representative from the Karmahapatra family currently the grandson of Satyabrata Karmahapatra and Subrata karmahapatra, named Ranajay Kar and Suvajeet kar Mohapatra does all the sacred rituals associated with the Snan Purnima and Rath yatra. Unlike Puri, most of the rituals are followed here.

In Rath yatra, that way Brothers Jagannath and balaram along with their sister Subhadra go to aunt's house (Masir bari) which is around 0.7 km from the main temple. They stay there for a week and then return on the occasion of ultorath (Bahuda in Odia). Before the Bahuda or ultorath, Hera Panchami festival is being celebrated. During these days, the residents of Mohanpur also enjoy in the form of a mela and social gathering. Stalls sell cosmetics as well as sweet items like jilipi, khasta goja, and kathi bhaja. But mostly various baby plants are sold. The Rath yatra in Mohanpur is quite a large human gathering.

Analogous to Puri Jagannath the main deity of this temple is also made of daru bramha and sacred salagram Silas have been kept inside the idols' wooden structure which is why, the idols are heavy, making it difficult for the brahmins who carry the idols upon their shoulders during the Rath yatra.

Not only the locals of Mohanpur but also from the various parts of the state people come for darshan here in this temple due to its famous tales and ancient architecture.

References

Hindu temples in West Bengal
Temples dedicated to Jagannath
Tourist attractions in Paschim Medinipur district